Gorgeous Frankenstein was an American horror punk/heavy metal band formed in 2005 in New Jersey by Doyle Wolfgang von Frankenstein and his former wife and ex-professional wrestler Stephanie Bellars ( Gorgeous George).

History 

In 2005, Doyle left New Jersey for Las Vegas and began auditioning members for his own band, Gorgeous Frankenstein. The same year, he appeared on stage with Danzig numerous times throughout their tour and lead vocalist Glenn Danzig offered to produce Gorgeous Frankenstein first eponymous album on his record Label Evilive.

The name of the band is a combination of both Doyle Wolfgang von Frankenstein and his wife Stephanie Bellars (Gorgeous George) names into a portmanteau concept.

Members and lineups 
In 2006, Doyle and Danzig had recruited bassist Argyle Goolsby (lead vocalist of Blitzkid) and hired British comic book artist Simon Bisley to do the cover artwork (Bisley previously published some of his works at Verotik, Danzig's mature-themed comic books company).

The musical arrangements of the band's debut album were completed before July 2007, but Doyle did not yet find a vocalist. He finally recruited vocalist Landon Blood for the recordings of the album and ex-Blitzkid drummer Jesco Devilanse (Andrew "Stipes" Winter).

Later in 2007, Gorgeous Frankenstein played their first tour, opening for Danzig. This lineup included Argyle Goolsby (who also acted as lead vocalist, since Landon Blood left the band) and Dr. Chud on drums. Stephanie Bellars (Gorgeous George) was part of these shows as a dancer.

Doyle began to audition for a singer for the band and recruited Cancerslug's frontman Alex Story.

Disbandment and new band project 

In 2012, following Alex Story's suggestion, Doyle decided to abandon Gorgeous Frankenstein and go forward with a new band project eponymously named Doyle. As he explains:
I would play a show and people would come up and say, 'Oh, I didn't even know you had a band.' Like when I would open for Danzig. [...] My singer [Alex Story] suggested to me that we change the name because it was the most recognizeable part of the band and I said okay.

The following year, Doyle (the band) would record a debut album entitled Abominator (2013).

Members 
Final lineup
 Doyle Wolfgang von Frankenstein – guitar (2005–2012) (ex-Misfits, ex-Kryst the Conqueror)
 "Left Hand" Graham – bass (2008–2012) (ex-Graves, ex-Doyle)
 Dr. Chud – drums (2008–2012) (ex-Kryst the Conqueror, Dr. Chud's X-Ward, ex-Graves, Dan Kidney and the Pulsations, ex-Misfits, ex-Sacred Trash, ex-Sardonica, ex-The Lost Boys)
 Alex Story – vocals (2009–2012) (Cancerslug, Doyle)
 Gorgeous George (Stephanie Bellars) – dancer

Previous members
 Argyle Goolsby – bass, vocals (2007)
 Landon Blood – vocals (2007)
 Jesco Devilsanse – drums (2007) (ex-Blitzkid)
 Michale Graves – vocals (guest)

Discography

Albums 
 Gorgeous Frankenstein, Evilive/Megaforce Records, 2007; 2008

Bootleg 
 Live at the DNA Lounge 8-24-2008, 2008

Video 
 You Must See It to Believe It!!!, Live, Evilive, 2010 (includes two videos, "Gorgeous Frankenstein" and "Man or Monster", and a 2008 tour documentary)

References 

2005 establishments in New Jersey
Horror punk groups
Heavy metal musical groups from New Jersey
Musical groups established in 2005
Musical groups disestablished in 2012
Musical groups from New Jersey